Genoplesium brachystachyum, commonly known as the Rocky Cape midge orchid or short-spike midge orchid, is a species of small terrestrial orchid endemic to Tasmania. It has a single thin leaf fused to the flowering stem and up to twelve small, green to brownish green, and reddish flowers. It usually grows in heath in rocky places near the coast.

Description
As with others in the genus, the flowers are inverted so that the labellum is above the column rather than below it. There is a callus in the centre of the labellum and extending nearly to its tip. Flowering occurs from February to April.

Taxonomy and naming
The Rocky Cape orchid was first formally described in 1840 by John Lindley who gave it the name Prasophyllum brachystachyum from a specimen collected near Rocky Cape. The description was published in Lindley's book, The Genera and Species of Orchidaceous Plants. In 1989, David Jones and Mark Clements changed the name to Genoplesium brachystachyum and in 2002 changed the name again to Corunastylis brachystachya. The specific epithet (brachystachyum) in derived from the Ancient Greek words brachys meaning "short" and stachys meaning "an ear of grain" or "a spike".

Distribution and habitat
Genoplesium brachystachyum grows in heath and heathy forest, among low shrubs, boulders and rock plates. It is found in disjunct populations containing fewer than 25 individuals near the north and west coasts.

Conservation
The total population of G. brachystachyum is estimated to be less than 250. The main threats to the species are land clearing, inappropriate fire regimes and inappropriate disturbances such as roadworks. The species (as Corunastylis brachystachya) is classed as "Endangered" under the Tasmanian Threatened Species Protection Act 1995 and under the Commonwealth Government Environment Protection and Biodiversity Conservation Act 1999 (EPBC) Act.

References

brachystachyum
Endemic orchids of Australia
Orchids of Tasmania
Plants described in 1840